Below is a partial list of minor league baseball players in the Seattle Mariners system.

Players

Prelander Berroa

Prelander Berroa (born April 18, 2000) is a Dominican professional baseball pitcher in the Seattle Mariners organization.

Berroa signed with the Minnesota Twins as an international free agent in July 2016. He made his professional debut in 2017 with the Dominican Summer League Twins. On July 31, 2019, the Twins traded Berroa, Jaylin Davis, and Kai-Wei Teng to the San Francisco Giants for Sam Dyson. On May 11, 2022, the Giants traded him to the Seattle Mariners for Donnie Walton.

The Mariners added Berroa to their 40-man roster after the 2022 season. Berroa was optioned to the Double-A Arkansas Travelers to begin the 2023 season.

Isaiah Campbell

Isaiah Lyn Campbell (born August 15, 1997) is an American professional baseball pitcher in the Seattle Mariners organization. Campbell was selected in the second round by the Mariners in the 2019 Major League Baseball draft.

Campbell was born in Portugal while his father was stationed there while serving in the Air Force but grew up in Kansas and attended Olathe South High School in Olathe, Kansas. As a senior, he went 5–1 with a 1.66 ERA. He struck out 42 batters in  innings.

Campbell made six starts and 13 appearances for the Arkansas Razorbacks as a true freshman. He had 23 strikeouts in  innings pitched while going 3–1 with a 3.69 ERA. He was also named to the Southeastern Conference First Year Academic Honor Roll. His sophomore season in 2017 was cut short after just  of an inning due to an elbow injury, for which he was granted a medical redshirt. He helped the Razorbacks to the 2018 College World Series final, winning the game in the semi-final that allowed them to advance to the final. That season, he appeared in 18 games, making 17 starts, including four in the NCAA tournament and two in the College World Series. After the 2018 season, he was drafted by the Los Angeles Angels in the 24th round of the 2018 Major League Baseball draft but opted to return for his junior season. In 2019, he had his best season yet, making 18 starts, striking out 125 batters in  innings and going 12–1 with a 2.13 ERA. The Razorbacks once again made the College World Series but were eliminated in the first round by Florida State.

Campbell was selected by the Seattle Mariners in the second round of the 2019 Major League Baseball draft. Campbell signed with the Mariners for an $850,000 signing bonus. He did not play after signing, and did not play a minor league game in 2020 due to the cancellation of the minor league season caused by the COVID-19 pandemic. He made his professional debut in 2021 with the Everett AquaSox of the High-A West, pitching  innings and going 3–1 with a 2.33 ERA. His season ended prematurely after undergoing elbow surgery.

Campbell was optioned to the Double-A Arkansas Naturals to begin the 2023 season.

Arkansas Razorbacks bio

Chris Clarke

Christopher Norman Clarke (born May 13, 1998) is an American professional baseball pitcher for the Seattle Mariners of Major League Baseball.

Clarke attended Newbury Park High School in Newbury Park, California. Clarke attended the University of Southern California (USC), where he played college baseball for the USC Trojans. The Chicago Cubs selected Clarke in the fourth round, with the 132nd overall selection, of the 2019 MLB draft.

The Seattle Mariners selected Clarke from the Cubs in the 2022 Rule 5 draft.

Jonatan Clase

Jonatan Clase (born May 23, 2002) is a Dominican professional baseball outfielder in the Seattle Mariners organization.

Clase signed with the Seattle Mariners as an international free agent in July 2018. He made his professional debut in 2019 with the Dominican Summer League Mariners.

The Mariners added Clase to their 40-man roster after the 2022 season. He was optioned to the High-A Everett AquaSox to begin the 2023 season.

Zach DeLoach

Zachary Dixon DeLoach (born August 18, 1998) is an American professional baseball outfielder in the Seattle Mariners organization.

DeLoach grew up in Lewisville, Texas and attended Hebron High School. He played college baseball for the Texas A&M Aggies for three seasons. He started 61 games as a true freshman in 2018 and hit .264. DeLoach played collegiate summer baseball for the Wisconsin Woodchucks of the Northwoods League and was named a league All-Star after hitting .323 with five home runs, 17 doubles, 38 RBIs and 10 stolen bases. He hit for a .200 average in his sophomore season. After the 2019 season he played for the Falmouth Commodores in the Cape Cod Baseball League, where he was named a league all-star and led the league with a .353 batting average. As a junior in 2020, DeLoach batted .421 with six home runs, 17 RBIs, and 25 runs scored in 18 games before the season was cut short due to the coronavirus pandemic.

DeLoach was selected in the second round by the Seattle Mariners in the 2020 Major League Baseball draft. After signing, he was assigned to the Mariners' alternate training site as the minor league season was canceled due to the COVID-19 pandemic. DeLoach began the 2021 season with the Everett AquaSox of the High-A West. He was promoted to the Arkansas Travelers of the Double-A Central after batting .313 with nine home runs and 37 RBIs in 58 games with the AquaSox. Over 49 games with the Travelers to end the season, he hit .227 with five home runs and 22 RBIs. He played in the Arizona Fall League for the Peoria Javelinas after the season.

Texas A&M Aggies bio

Taylor Dollard

Taylor Joseph Dollard (born February 17, 1999) is an American professional baseball pitcher in the Seattle Mariners organization.

Dollard attended Crespi Carmelite High School in Encino, Los Angeles, California. As a junior in 2016, he went 2-4 with a 3.38 ERA over 12 appearances, and as a senior in 2017, he went 2-0 with a 1.43 ERA and 42 strikeouts over  innings. He went unselected out of high school in the 2017 Major League Baseball draft, and enrolled at Cal Poly San Luis Obispo to play college baseball.

Dollard made 19 appearance as a freshman at Cal Poly in 2018 and posted a 2.43 ERA. In 2019, his sophomore year, he made 19 relief appearances and went 5-0 with a 2.89 ERA and 48 strikeouts over  innings. After the 2019 season, Dollard played collegiate summer baseball in the Cape Cod Baseball League with for the Yarmouth-Dennis Red Sox. He made four starts in 2020 before the season was cancelled due to the COVID-19 pandemic. Dollard was selected by the Seattle Mariners in the fifth round of the shortened 2020 Major League Baseball draft with the 137th overall selection. He signed for $406,000.

Dollard made his professional debut in 2021 with the Modesto Nuts and was promoted to the Everett AquaSox during the season. Over 19 games (18 starts) between the two teams, he went 9-4 with a 5.14 ERA and 133 strikeouts over 105 innings. He played the 2022 season with the Arkansas Travelers. Over 27 starts, he went 16-2 with a 2.25 ERA and 131 strikeouts over 144 innings. He led the minor leagues in wins.

Adam Hill

Adam Dean Hill (born March 24, 1997) is an American professional baseball pitcher in the Seattle Mariners organization.

Hill attended T. L. Hanna High School in Anderson, South Carolina. He was drafted by the San Diego Padres in the 39th round of the 2015 MLB draft, but he elected to honor his college commitment to the University of South Carolina. In his first year with the Gamecocks, he posted a 3.53 ERA in 66. innings, allowing 49 hits, walking 28, and striking out 72. In his sophomore year, he posted a 3.04 ERA in 77 innings, allowing 56 hits, walking 39, and striking out 87. Through 14 starts this season, Hill has posted a 4.08 ERA over 75 innings, allowing 49 hits, walking 46, and striking out 92. In 2017, he played collegiate summer baseball with the Chatham Anglers of the Cape Cod Baseball League.

Hill was taken by the New York Mets in the fourth round with the 110th overall pick of the 2018 MLB draft. On June 22, 2018, the Mets officially signed him. He spent his first professional season with the Brooklyn Cyclones, going 1–1 with a 2.35 ERA over  relief innings pitched.

On January 5, 2019, the Mets traded Hill, Bobby Wahl, and Felix Valero to the Milwaukee Brewers for Keon Broxton. He spent 2019 with the Wisconsin Timber Rattlers, going 7–9 with a 3.92 ERA over 26 games (23 starts), striking out 109 over  innings.

On December 5, 2019, Hill and a 2020 competitive balance round B draft pick were traded to the Seattle Mariners in exchange for Omar Narváez. He did not play a game in 2020 due to the cancellation of the minor league season. In 2021, he started 19 games between the Everett AquaSox and the Arkansas Travelers, going 5–7 with a 5.44 ERA and 102 strikeouts over 91 innings.

Cade Marlowe

Matthew Cade Marlowe (born June 24, 1997) is an American professional baseball outfielder in the Seattle Mariners organization.

Marlowe attended Tiftarea Academy in Chula, Georgia, where he played baseball and batted .515 with 12 home runs, 35 RBIs, and 34 stolen bases as a senior in 2015. He went undrafted out of high school, and fulfilled his commitment to play college baseball at the University of West Georgia. During the summer of 2018, he played in the Coastal Plain League for the Savannah Bananas. As a senior in 2019, he batted .389 with five home runs and 39 RBIs while setting a single season school record with 46 stolen bases. After the season, he was selected by the Seattle Mariners in the 20th round of the 2019 Major League Baseball draft.

Marlowe signed with the Mariners and made his professional debut with the Everett AquaSox of the Class A Short Season Northwest League with whom he batted .301 with three home runs, thirty RBIs, and ten stolen bases over 62 games. He did not play a game in 2020 due to the cancellation of the minor league season. He began the 2021 season with the Modesto Nuts of the Low-A West before he was promoted to Everett (now members of the High-A West) where he earned Player of the Month honors for July. He also played in one game for the Tacoma Rainers of the Triple-A West at the end of the season. Over 106 games between the three teams, he slashed .275/.368/.566 with 26 home runs, 107 RBIs, 25 doubles and 25 stolen bases. He was named the Most Valuable Player of the High-A West. The Mariners also named him their Ken Griffey Jr. Minor League Hitter of the Year. He was assigned to the Arkansas Travelers of the Double-A Texas League to begin the 2022 season. He was promoted to Tacoma at the season's end. Over 133 games between the two teams, he slashed .287/.377/.487 with 23 home runs, 102 RBIs, and 42 stolen bases.

On November 15, 2022, the Mariners selected Marlowe's contract and added him to the 40-man roster. Marlowe was optioned to the Triple-A Tacoma Rainiers to begin the 2023 season.

Bryce Miller

Bryce Austen Miller (born August 23, 1998) is an American professional baseball pitcher in the Seattle Mariners organization.

Miller attended New Braunfels High School in New Braunfels, Texas. He played college baseball at Blinn College originally. He was drafted by the Miami Marlins in the 38th round of the 2018 Major League Baseball Draft, but did not sign and transferred to Texas A&M University. In 2019, he played collegiate summer baseball with the Falmouth Commodores of the Cape Cod Baseball League. He was drafted by the Seattle Mariners in the fourth round of the 2021 Major League Baseball draft and signed.

Miller made his professional debut with the Modesto Nuts. He started 2022 with the Everett AquaSox and made one start for Modesto.

Robert Pérez Jr.

Robert Alexander Pérez Jr. (born June 26, 2000) is a Venezuelan professional baseball first baseman in the Seattle Mariners organization.

Pérez Jr. signed with the Seattle Mariners as an international free agent in July 2016. He made his professional debut in 2017 with the Dominican Summer League Mariners and also played with them in 2018. In 2019 he played with the Arizona League Mariners, Everett AquaSox and Tacoma Rainiers.

Pérez Jr. did not play in 2020 due to the Minor League Baseball season being cancelled because of the Covid-19 pandemic. He returned in 2021 to play for the Modesto Nuts. He started 2022 with Modesto before being promoted to the Everett AquaSox. After the season, he played in the Arizona Fall League.

Kaden Polcovich

Kaden James Polcovich (born February 21, 1999) is an American professional baseball second baseman in the Seattle Mariners organization.

Polcovich attended Deer Creek High School in Edmond, Oklahoma. After his junior year 2016 in which he batted .321 with 26 RBIs, he committed to play college baseball at the University of Kentucky. Polcovich went unselected in the 2017 Major League Baseball draft, and enrolled at Kentucky.

Polcovich was dismissed from the Kentucky baseball team during the first semester of his freshman year, and thus did not make an appearance for them. He left Kentucky, and then enrolled at Northwest Florida State College where he hit .280 with three home runs, 18 RBIs, and 13 stolen bases over forty games as a freshman in 2018 while then batting .273 with 12 home runs and 38 RBIs over 53 games as a sophomore in 2019. After his sophomore year in 2019, he played collegiate summer baseball with the Chatham Anglers of the Cape Cod Baseball League and was named a league all-star. He also transferred to Oklahoma State University. As a junior at Oklahoma State in 2020, he batted .344 with two home runs over 21 games before the season was cancelled due to the COVID-19 pandemic. He was selected by the Seattle Mariners in the third round (78th overall) of the 2020 Major League Baseball draft and signed.

Polcovich made his professional debut in 2021 with the Everett AquaSox of the High-A West with whom he batted .271/.415/.505 with ten home runs, 47 RBIs, and 16 stolen bases over 58 games. He was promoted to the Arkansas Travelers of the Double-A South in late July, slashing .133/.242/.211 with two home runs, 14 RBIs, and four doubles over 36 games to end the season. He returned to Arkansas for the 2022 season. Over 118 games, he batted .242/.345/.386 with 12 home runs, sixty RBIs, and 18 stolen bases.

Polcovich's father, Kevin played in Major League Baseball for the Pittsburgh Pirates in 1997 and 1998.

Alberto Rodríguez

Alberto Rodríguez (born October 6, 2000) is a Dominican Republic professional baseball outfielder for the Seattle Mariners of Major League Baseball.

Rodríguez signed with the Toronto Blue Jays as an international free agent in 2017. After the 2020 season, the Blue Jays traded Rodríguez to the Seattle Mariners as the player to be named later in the trade for Taijuan Walker after the 2020 season. 

On November 18, 2021, the Mariners added Rodríguez to their 40-man roster to protect him from the Rule 5 draft. In 2022, Rodríguez appeared in 119 games for the High-A Everett AquaSox, slashing .261/.336/.396 with 10 home runs and 46 RBI. 

On January 17, 2023, Rodríguez was designated for assignment by Seattle following the acquisition of J. B. Bukauskas. On January 24, Rodríguez cleared waivers and was sent outright to High-A Everett.

Jake Scheiner

Jake Maxwell Scheiner (born August 13, 1995) is an American professional baseball third baseman in the Seattle Mariners organization.

Scheiner's was born in San Mateo, California, to Jeff and Tani Scheiner, and his siblings are Sam and Sophie. He attended Maria Carrillo High School in Santa Rosa, California. He was First Team All-League in 2012 and 2013, and First Team All-Empire in 2014. He was not drafted out of high school in the 2014 Major League Baseball draft, and enrolled at Santa Rosa Junior College where he played college baseball.

Scheiner redshirted as a freshman at Santa Rosa in 2015. In 2016, as a redshirt freshman, he hit .402/.486/.674 with eight home runs and 61 RBIs in 184 at bats over 47 games. He was named Big 8 Most Valuable Player, NorCal Player of the Year, First Team All-American, and State Championship MVP. 

After the season, he transferred to the University of Houston. In 63 games, he slashed .346 (fourth in the American Athletic Conference)/.432(fourth)/.667(leading the conference) in 243 at-bats with fifty runs (second), 18 doubles (third), three triples (sixth), and 18 home runs, 64 RBIs, and 12 hit by pitch--all leading the conference, while playing shortstop, third base, and second base. He was named American Athletic Conference Co-Player of the Year, and was a consensus All-American.

After the season, Scheiner was selected by the Philadelphia Phillies in the fourth round of the 2017 Major League Baseball draft. He signed with the Phillies, and was assigned to the Williamsport Crosscutters of the Class A Short Season New York–Penn League, batting .250 with 14 doubles (ninth in the league), four home runs, 19 RBIs, and seven hit by pitch (third) in 236 at-bats over 61 games. 

In 2018, Scheiner played for the Lakewood BlueClaws of the Class A South Atlantic League, where he hit .296/.372/.470 in 463 at-bats with thirty doubles (fifth in the league), five triples (seventh), 13 home runs, 67 RBIs (sixth), and 49 walks (fifth) in 122 games and was named a South Atlantic League Mid-Season All-Star and Post-Season All Star. He began 2019 with the Clearwater Threshers of the Class A-Advanced Florida State League.

On June 2, 2019, Scheiner was traded to the Seattle Mariners in exchange for Jay Bruce and cash considerations. He was assigned to the Modesto Nuts of the Class A-Advanced California League, with whom he finished the season. Over 119 games between Clearwater and Modesto, Scheiner slashed .266/.325/.451 with 16 home runs and 83 RBIs. His .504 slugging percentage with Modesto was 9th in the league.

Scheiner did not play a minor league game in 2020 due to the cancellation of the minor league season caused by the COVID-19 pandemic. He was assigned to the Arkansas Travelers of the Double-A Central for the 2021 season, where he slashed .253/.343/.456 with 74 runs (second in the league), 20 doubles (eiegth), 18 home runs (seventh), 60 RBIs (tenth), 47 walks (ninth), and nine hit by pitch (ninth), while leading the league with 133 strikeouts. On May 23, 2021, he was named Texas Player of the Week. In the field he played first base, third base, second base, right field, left field, and shortstop. 

He returned to Arkansas for the 2022 season. Over 127 games and 477 at bats he led the Texas League with 34 doubles and 105 RBIs, and batted .252/.356/.455 with 21 home runs (seventh in the league), 73 walks (fourth), and 9 sacrifice flies (second). Defensively, he played first base, third base, and left field.

Juan Then

Juan Manuel Then (born February 7, 2000) is a Dominican professional baseball pitcher in the Seattle Mariners organization.

Then signed with the Seattle Mariners as an international free agent in 2016. On November 18, 2017, Then and J. P. Sears were traded to the New York Yankees for Nick Rumbelow. On June 15, 2019, the Yankees traded Then back to the Mariners for Edwin Encarnación.

On November 20, 2020, the Mariners added Then to their 40-man roster to protect him from the Rule 5 draft.

Then was optioned to the Double-A Arkansas Travelers to begin the 2023 season.

Bryan Woo

Bryan Joseph Woo (born January 30, 2000) is an American professional baseball pitcher in the Seattle Mariners organization.

Woo attended Alameda High School in Alameda, California, where he played on their baseball team. As a senior in 2018, he went 8-2 with a 1.25 ERA while hitting .422. That summer, he played in the Alaska Baseball League with the Peninsula Oilers. 

After high school, Woo enrolled at Cal Poly to play college baseball. As a freshman in 2019, he pitched to an 8.75 ERA over  innings. He returned to play for the Oilers that summer. He pitched only  innings in 2020 before the college baseball season was cancelled due to the COVID-19 pandemic, and compiled a 6.11 ERA over 28 innings in 2021 before undergoing Tommy John surgery and missing the rest of the year. 

After the season, Woo was selected by the Seattle Mariners in the sixth round with the 174th overall selection of the 2021 Major League Baseball draft. He signed with the Mariners for $318,200. He made his professional debut in 2022 with the Arizona Complex League Mariners and was promoted to the Modesto Nuts and Everett AquaSox during the season. Over 16 starts for the season between the three clubs, Woo posted a 1-4 record with a 4.11 ERA and 84 strikeouts over 57 innings. He was selected to play in the Arizona Fall League for the Peoria Javelinas after the season.

Cal Poly Mustangs bio

Full Triple-A to Rookie League rosters

Triple-A

Double-A

High-A

Single-A

Rookie

Foreign Rookie

References

Living people
Minor league players
Lists of minor league baseball players
Year of birth missing (living people)